Clive Culbertson (born 28 August 1954, Ballymoney, County Antrim, Northern Ireland) is the founder of The Order Of Druids In Ulster. He is a mystic, musician and healer. Culbertson trained with his friend and teacher, the late Ben McBrady, Aircinneac and Herenach of "The Old Gaelic Order"- the order that was in Ireland before the Druids came. Culbertson was given a lineage of authority from McBrady to start his own order – this work is now under construction.

Culbertson is a bassist, vocalist, songwriter, recording engineer and record producer. He has recorded and toured with many artists – among his list of credits are White Roxx, Van Morrison and The Chieftains and the Avalon Sunset album. Currently he is bassist/vocalist and musical director with country rock band, New Moon, of which he is also a founder member. Their latest album, Emerald Country Shack, has received critical acclaim, and is a featured album on many radio stations in Ireland and Britain.

References

1954 births
Living people
Neo-druids
Musicians from County Antrim
Van Morrison
Modern pagans from Northern Ireland
People from Ballymoney
British modern pagans